The Amax Double Eagle TT is an Australian autogyro that was designed and produced by Amax Engineering of Donvale, Victoria in the late 1990s. Now out of production, when it was available the aircraft was supplied as a kit for amateur construction.

The "TT" designation indicates "Tall Tail". The aircraft has higher landing gear, allowing the engine to be placed on the vertical center of gravity, which eliminates pitch changes with throttle application.

Design and development
The Double Eagle TT was designed to comply with amateur-built aircraft rules. It features a single main rotor, a two-seats-in tandem open cockpit without a windshield, tricycle landing gear with wheel pants and a four-cylinder, liquid-cooled, four-stroke, single-ignition  Subaru EA82 automotive engine in pusher configuration.

The aircraft fuselage is made from welded 4130 steel tubing, with some aluminum parts.

The manufacturer estimates the construction time from the supplied kit as 100 hours.

Specifications (Double Eagle TT)

See also
List of rotorcraft

References

Double Eagle TT
1990s Australian sport aircraft
1990s Australian ultralight aircraft
Homebuilt aircraft
Single-engined pusher autogyros